Blobfish may refer to:

Psychrolutidae, a fish family commonly known as blobfishes
Psychrolutes microporos, commonly known as a blobfish or fathead, and the subject of a well-known photograph
Psychrolutes marcidus, commonly known as a smooth-head blobfish or simply a blobfish
Psychrolutes occidentalis, Western blobfish or Western Australian sculpin
 Psychrolutes phrictus, blob sculpin, also commonly known as a blobfish
 Ebinania macquariensis, Macquarie blobfish, a species of Ebinania